Juan Angel Paredes (born 30 March 1979) is a professional football striker from Paraguay. He currently plays for Sport Huancayo.

References
 Profile at BDFA 

1979 births
Living people
Paraguayan footballers
Paraguayan expatriate footballers
Paraguay international footballers
Cerro Porteño players
12 de Octubre Football Club players
Club Olimpia footballers
Club América footballers
Atlante F.C. footballers
L.D.U. Quito footballers
Club Deportivo Palestino footballers
Danubio F.C. players
The Strongest players
Expatriate footballers in Chile
Expatriate footballers in Peru
Expatriate footballers in Mexico
Expatriate footballers in Bolivia
Expatriate footballers in Ecuador
Expatriate footballers in Uruguay
Association football forwards